Neyo is a Kru language of Ivory Coast, near the mouth of the Sassandra River.

Alphabet
 a - [a]
 b - [b]
 bh - [ɓ]
 c - [c]
 d - [d]
 é - [e]
 e - [ɪ]
 è - [ɛ]
 f - [f]
 g - [g]
 gb - [g͡b]
 i - [i]
 dj - [ɟ]
 k - [k]
 kp - [k͡p]
 l - [l]
 m - [m]
 n - [n]
 ñ - [ɲ]
 ng - [ŋ]
 ô - [o]
 ö - [ʊ]
 o - [ɔ]
 p - [p]
 s - [s]
 t - [t]
 u - [u]
 v - [v]
 w - [w]
 y - [j]
 z - [z]

Tones
 é - high tone
 e/ē - mid tone
 è - low tone

References

Kru languages
Languages of Ivory Coast